The 2019 Campeón de Campeones was a Mexican football match that took place on July 14, 2019. The match is the fifth edition of the modern Campeón de Campeones, contested by the Liga MX season's Apertura and Clausura champions. The 2019 edition featured Club América, the Apertura champion, and Tigres UANL, the Clausura champion, at the Dignity Health Sports Park (formerly known as the StubHub Center) in Carson, California, hosting for the fourth consecutive year. Like previous editions, the Campeón de Campeones was contested at a neutral venue in the United States and paired with the 2019 Supercopa MX.

The winner of this match qualified for the 2019 Campeones Cup and take on the 2018 Major League Soccer champions Atlanta United on August 14, 2019 at Mercedes-Benz Stadium in Atlanta, Georgia.

Match details

References

Campeón de Campeones
Campeón de Campeones
July 2019 sports events in Mexico